The following is a list of events in the year 2023 in Chile.

Incumbents
 President: 
Gabriel Boric (CS)

Events
 3 February: The government expands its state of emergency due to wildfires that began on 31 January and have burned up to 8,000 hectares. It also declares a catastrophe in the Biobío region amid a summer heat wave.

Scheduled
 19-24 February: LXII Viña del Mar International Song Festival
 20 October-5 November: 2023 Pan American Games

Deaths 

 1 January: Francisco Bozinovic, 63, Chilean-Croatian biologist and academic.
 4 January: Marino Penna, 93, chemical engineer and politician, deputy (1965–1973).
 6 January: Paula Quintana, 66, sociologist and politician.
 16 January: Lupe Serrano, 92, Chilean-born American ballerina.
 21 January: Stephanie Subercaseaux, 38, racing cyclist.
 11 February: Tito Fernández, 80, singer-songwriter.
 16 February: Aníbal Palma, 87, politician and diplomat, minister general secretariat of government (1973), minister of education (1972) and housing and urbanism (1973).
 22 February: Tatiana Lobo, 83, Chilean-born Costa Rican writer.

References 

 
Chile
Chile
2020s in Chile
Years of the 21st century in Chile